Ringrose may refer to:
Bert Ringrose, English footballer 
Billy Ringrose (1930–2020), Irish equestrian 
Doug Ringrose (1900–1953), Australian rules footballer 
Garry Ringrose, Irish rugby union player
Hedley Ringrose (1942–2021), British Anglican priest
John Robert Ringrose, mathematician
William Ringrose, English cricketer